The following are plant species which are or have been held to be at least nationally extinct in the British Isles, since Britain was cut off from the European continent, including any which have been reintroduced or reestablished, not including regional extirpations. Many of these species persist in other countries.

Adonis annua, pheasant's eye (extinct in Ireland, Scotland and Wales, survives in England)
Agrostemma githago, corncockle (died out in Ireland, reintroduced) persists in all countries of the United Kingdom
Ajuga genevensis, blue bugle (extinct across the whole of the British Isles since 1967)
Anthemis arvensis, corn chamomile (died out in Ireland, reintroduced) persists in all countries of the United Kingdom
Arnoseris minima, lamb-succory (extinct across the British Isles in 1971) one recent sighting in England
Aulacomnium turgidum, swollen thread moss (extinct in England since 1878) persists in Scotland
Bartramia stricta, upright apple-moss (extinct in England since 1864) persists in Wales
Bromus interruptus, interrupted brome (died out in the wild globally in 1970) (reintroduced from stored seed in 2004)
Bryum calophyllum, matted bryum (extinct in England since 1983) may persist in Scotland
Bryum turbinatum, topshape thread-moss (extinct across the British Isles since the 1940s)
Carex davalliana, Davall's sedge (extinct across the British Isles since 1852)
Carex trinervis, three-nerved sedge (extinct across the British Isles since 1869)
Caucalis platycarpos, small bur parsley (extinct across the British Isles since the 1950s)
Centaurium scilloides, perennial centaury (died out in England in 1967) possibly persists in Wales and the south of England
Conostomum tetragonum, helmet-moss (extinct in England since the 1950s) persists in Scotland
Crepis foetida, stinking hawksbeard (died out across the British Isles in 1980) (reintroduced)

Cynodontium polycarpon, many-fruited dogtooth (extinct across the British Isles since the 1960s)
Cynoglossum germanicum green houndstongue (died out in Scotland) persists in England
Cystopteris alpina, alpine bladder-fern (extinct across the British Isles since 1911)
Cystopteris montana, mountain bladder-fern (died out in England in 1880) persists in Scotland
Dicranum elongatum, dense fork-moss (extinct across the British Isles since the late 1800s)
Diplophyllum taxifolium, alpine earwort (died out in England in the 1950s) persists in Scotland
Epipogium aphyllum, ghost orchid (England only, was extinct for several years, rediscovered, extinction very likely)
Euphorbia peplis, purple spurge (extinct in England since 1951) persists in Northern Ireland
Euphorbia villosa, hairy spurge (died out in England in 1924) one recent sighting in England
Galeopsis segetum, downy hempnettle (died out in England in 1975) a few recent sightings in England, Wales and Ireland
Gyroweisia reflexa, reflexed beardless moss (extinct across the British Isles since 1938)
Helodium blandowii, Blandow's bogmoss (extinct across the British Isles since 1901)
Herzogiella striatella, Muhlenbeck's feather-moss (died out in England in the 1950s) persists in Scotland
Hieracium cambricogothicum, Llanfairfechan hawkweed (was an endemic, so globally extinct since 2008)
Kiaeria falcata, sickle-leaved fork-moss (died out in England in the 1950s) persists in Scotland and Wales
Matthiola sinuata, sea stock (died out in Ireland and Scotland) persists in Wales and England
Najas flexilis, slender naiad (died out in England in 1982) persists in Scotland and Ireland

Nitella gracilis, slender stonewort (died out in England in 1914) may survive in Scotland
Otanthus maritimus, cottonweed (died out in England in 1936) persists in Ireland
Paludella squarrosa, tufted fen-moss (extinct across the UK since 1916)
Philonotis tomentella, woolly apple-moss (died out in England in the 1950s) persists in Scotland
Pohlia proligera, bent-bud thread-moss (died out in England in the 1950s) persists in Scotland and one recent sighting in England
Polygonatum verticillatum, whorled solomon's-seal (reintroduced or reestablished) 
Pterygoneurum lamellatum, spiral chalk moss (extinct across the British Isles since 1970)
Ranunculus arvensis corn buttercup (extinct in Ireland since at least the 1930s and probably also extinct in Scotland)
Saxifraga rosacea, Irish saxifrage (died out in England in 1960) persists in Wales and Ireland
Scandix pecten-veneris, shepherd's needle (extinct in Ireland) persists in Scotland, Wales and England
Scheuchzeria palustris, Rannoch rush (extinct in England since 1900, extinct in Ireland) persists in Scotland
Serratula tinctoria, saw-wort (extinct in Ireland) persists in England and Wales
Sphagnum obtusum, obtuse bog moss (extinct across the British Isles since 1911)
Sphagnum strictum, pale bog moss (extinct across the British Isles since the 1950s) 2 recent unconfirmed sightings in Scotland
Spiranthes aestivalis, summer lady's-tresses (extinct across the British Isles since the 1950s)
Spiranthes romanzoffiana, Irish lady's tresses (extinct in England since the 1990s) persists in Scotland, Ireland and Northern Ireland, recently spread to Wales
Tetrodontium repandum, small four-tooth moss (extinct across the British Isles since 1958)
Tolypella nodifica, bird's nest stonewort (extinct across the British Isles since 1956)

Mosses feature frequently in the list. The flowering plant families appearing most frequently in the list are the Asteraceae and the Orchidaceae. Commonly cited reasons for plant extinctions in the UK include habitat loss, drainage, changes to farming systems and overgrazing. The most threatened habitats in the UK include meadows, peat bogs and marshes. The United Kingdom and Ireland both have a relatively small proportion of forest cover compared to other countries. In 2017 the UK was 13% forested In 2019 Ireland was just 11% forested. Charities involved in plant conservation in the UK include The Wildlife Trusts, Plantlife, The Botanical Society of Britain and Ireland, Back From The Brink and Chester Zoo. Sightings of any of these species should be reported to the Botanical Society of Britain and Ireland, or the British Bryological Society in the case of mosses.

See also

List of extinct animals of the British Isles
List of endemic species of the British Isles
Rewilding

References

British Isles